Samuel Thomas Turpin (born 2 September 1995) is a South African rapper, producer and musical artist.

He is the son of South African photographer and activist Gisèle Wulfsohn.

Biography 
Turpin grew up in Johannesburg, South Africa where he was exposed to a variety of cultural influences, including hip hop music and hip hop culture. In 2011, his mother passed away from cancer and the following year Turpin began making music as an outlet to express emotion and cope with loss.

Music career 
In 2013, Turpin released his debut single "Cranes" which garnered enough interest for him to start performing around Johannesburg. In 2014, he released his debut EP "Eternal Sentiment" as a limited online release. Turpin released his second EP "Wasi-Wasi" accompanied by some self-produced music videos. In 2016, Sam was interviewed about the state of South African youth and society in director Lebogang Rasethaba's noted documentary "The People Versus The Rainbow Nation" which was released on MTV.  In 2017, he released his first full-length mixtape "4am In Jozi", a musical ode to the night-time anxieties of central Johannesburg. The project garnered Turpin a brand showcase of selected artists as well as fashion-oriented placements in the South African creative industry.

In early 2019, Turpin released the first single since his mixtape, a song titled "Summer Evening" featuring London-based India Shan, which plays like a personal letter to his mother. According to Turpin, this was the first time he was able to express himself "directly" to his mother since she passed. This was followed by "Sahara Flow", a single drawing more from his Jewish heritage, sampling an ancient Hebrew chant, sung by South African singer Jessica Sherman. In late 2019, Turpin joined the live ensemble of The Charles Géne Suite and began performing at festivals, club shows and events.

In mid-March 2020, during South Africa's COVID-19 lockdown, Turpin and collaborator Lenny-Dee Doucha released their single "Cloud City" specifically for their followers in lockdown. In May 2020, Turpin collaborated with film maker Katya Abedian-Rawháni to release their short musical film "Sahara Flow" which premiered via London's Nataal Magazine. In early 2022, Turpin participated in the POST POST digital concert organised by Music in Africa and Tshepang Ramoba of the renowned BLK JKS and released his latest single "Broken Mirror", collaborating on the cover artwork with Japanese visual artist Keisuke Nakayama. While working on his second mixtape, Sam was featured on The Charles Géne Suite's debut album "Suite Nites", appearing on two tracks. In mid 2022 Sam produced and starred in the short film and music video for “Whiskey Music” off of The Charles Géne Suite album. In November 2022, Sam travelled to Cape Town with fellow artist Laliboi to perform at two shows, Selective Live and The Lightning Bolt Festival.

In January 2023, the Suite Nites album featuring Sam was released in Japan as a deluxe physical edition through Paraphernalia Records and Disk Union.

Personal life and education 
In 2017, Turpin received a Bachelor of Arts from the University of the Witwatersrand in Anthropology and History.
Turpin is fluent in English, isiZulu and also knows some basic French and Japanese.

Discography

Extended plays 

 Eternal Sentiment (2014)
 Wasi-Wasi (2015)

with ILLA N 

 Cold Chinese Food (2014)

Mixtapes 

 4am In Jozi (2017)

Albums

with The Charles Géne Suite 

 Suite Nites (2022)

References 

South African rappers
1995 births
Living people